Father Father may refer to:

Father Father, album by Pops Staples Grammy Award for Best Contemporary Blues Album 1995
"Father, Father", song by Phantom Power (Super Furry Animals album)
"Father, Father", song by Good Times (Kool & the Gang album)